Clean House is a home makeover and interior design television show, originally broadcast from 2003 until 2011 which aired 10 seasons of programs on the Style Network. Originally hosted by Niecy Nash and later by Tempestt Bledsoe, the show brings a four-person cleanup-and-renovation crew to the homes of families to clean up clutter.

In 2010, Nash announced that she would be leaving the series, though it will continue on without her. Her final episode aired on December 1, 2010. Later that month, the Style Network confirmed that former Cosby Show cast member Tempestt Bledsoe would take over as host. Her first episode aired on December 15, 2010. As of 2013, the show is believed to have been canceled due to low ratings after Nash's departure.

Series overview

Episode structure
Each episode begins with a short montage introducing the subjects of the makeover. The host guides family members through the process of letting go of things with the assistance of "Go-to-Guy," handyman Matt Iseman, "Yard Sale King," Joel Steingold and designer Didi Snyder. Previous seasons featured "Designer with all the magic" Mark Brunetz, "Yard Sale Guy" Allan Lee Haff, "Yard Sale Diva" comedic actress Trish Suhr, "Organizer" Linda Koopersmith, and "Designer" Michael Moloney.

The Clean House team will negotiate and make deals with family members in order to convince them to sell belongings. The excess belongings are sold at a yard sale to raise money for the makeover.  The show's production budget matches up to $1000 of the yard sale proceeds to be used on the makeover, and supplies all paint, labor, and in later seasons, the organizing costs.

Commercial breaks are often trailed with segments featuring quick interior design tips directed at the viewer usually presented by Brunetz and Nash, and organizational tips presented by Suhr.

Behind-the-scenes

Debi Gutierrez filled in for Niecy Nash in four episodes in 2007, "The Blount Family", "The Cohen Family", "The Bunce Family, and "The Freitz Family", while Nash was away filming Reno 911!: Miami. Style network stated that they were not replacing Nash with Gutierrez. Some people say Gutierrez was not chosen due to her "bullying" in one episode she hosted. She was attempting to convince a woman to give up her shoes. When she said, "Then do it without bitching", the woman gave up the shoes, and ran out crying to her husband saying that Debi bullied her.

In April 2015, some of the former cast members, including Niecy Nash, Mark Brunetz, Trish Suhr, and Matt Iseman, met up for a reunion and interview on The Hallmark Channel, discussing former home remodels, their time on the show, and past Clean House yard sales.

Cast

Timeline of cast members

Roles
 Host
 Niecy Nash (season 1–9)
 Tempestt Bledsoe (season 9–10)
 Lisa Arch (backup, season 8–10)

 Yard sale
 Allen Lee Haff ("Yard Sale Guy", season 1–4)
 Trish Suhr ("Yard Sale Diva", season 5–10)
 Joel Steingold ("Jack-of-All-Trades", season 9–10; "Yard Sale King", season 10)

 Organizer
 Linda Koopersmith (season 1–4)

 Handyman
 Matt Iseman ("Go-To Guy", season 5–10)

 Designer
 Mark Brunetz ("Designer With All the Magic", season 1–9)
 Michael Moloney (season 1–3)
 Didiayer Snyder (season 9–10)

Former cast

Guest cast
 Jason Fedele – Carpenter (2004-2005)
 Debi Gutierrez – Guest hostess, four episodes (2008)
 Kellie Shanygne Williams – Guest hostess, six episodes (2009)
 Tanya Whitford – Organizer (2004)
 Sean McEwen – Yard Sale Guy (2004)
 John Eric Bentley – Go-to-Guy (2006)
 Reign Morton – Yard Sale King (2009)
 Elijah Long – Go-to-Guy (2009)
 Kristin Casey – Designer (2009–2010)
 Jennifer Snowden – Designer (2010)

Seasons

Spin-offs
The show has spawned a spin-off series, Clean House Comes Clean, which showcases deleted/behind-the-scenes footage from previous episodes of the Clean House series. The series features commentary from Brunetz, Haff, Koopersmith, Suhr, and Iseman. Yearly, the crew also searches the country for homes that are the messiest, resulting in Clean House: The Messiest Home in the Country, and the excess proceeds go to charity. They use the show's money to decorate the house.

References

External links
 
 
Cleaning News

2003 American television series debuts
Makeover reality television series
Television shows set in Los Angeles
Style Network original programming
English-language television shows
2011 American television series endings